Professor James Weirick is an Australian academic who was the Director of the Master of Urban Development and Design (MUDD) program at the University of New South Wales (UNSW), Sydney, Australia.

Professor Weirick is well known as a world authority on Walter Burley Griffin and Marion Mahony Griffin, the architects who won the international competition to design the masterplan for Australia's capital, Canberra.

Prior to joining UNSW in 1991, Weirick was Head of Landscape Architecture at RMIT University (1988–91). He held academic positions at RMIT from 1987 to 1993. He was a lecturer in Landscape Architecture at Canberra College of Advanced Education (1982–1986). He has had various consultancies in Sydney, Melbourne and Canberra. Weirick holds a Master of Landscape Architecture from Harvard University.

References 
 James Weirick on ABC Compass program
 Article on Griffin Society website citing Weirick
 Australian Government National Capital Development Authority website Advisory Panel
 James Weirick adding to protesters voice about Sydney's oldest public open space on the ABC

Selected publications 
 Walker, M., Kabos, A. and Weirick, J. (1994) Building for nature : Walter Burley Griffin and Castlecrag, Castlecrag, N.S.W. : Walter Burley Griffin Society 

External links 
 Staff webpage at UNSW

Harvard Graduate School of Design alumni
Living people
Year of birth missing (living people)
Academic staff of RMIT University